Heat traps are valves or loops of pipe installed on the cold water inlet and hot water outlet pipes on water heaters. The heat traps allow cold water to flow into the water heater tank, but prevent unwanted convection and heated water to flow out of the tank. Newer water heaters have built-in heat traps.

About
Many water-heating pieces of equipment have integral heat traps installed from the factory. For water-heating equipment that does not already have factory installed heat traps, they must be purchased then installed in the inlet and outlet connections.

Heat traps are very simple and inexpensive. They are an effective way to prevent cooling of hot water in water heaters by thermosyphoning the hot water to a higher elevated portion of the piping system. Thermosyphoning is based on natural convection. Hot water rises and is then displaced by cold water beneath it. The heat trap stops this process, thus keeping the hot water inside the insulated storage tank.

See also
 Plumbing
 Thermosiphon
 Thermal barrier
 Thermal pad

Literature
 Have we forgotten to make heat traps? , Esbe AB, May 2012

References

Plumbing